Ezevets is a rural locality (a village) in Moseyevskoye Rural Settlement of Mezensky District, Arkhangelsk Oblast, Russia. The population was 41 as of 2010.

Geography 
Ezevets is located on the Pyoza River, 68 km east of Mezen (the district's administrative centre) by road.

References 

Rural localities in Mezensky District